Heliothis flavigera is a species of moth of the family Noctuidae first described by George Hampson in 1907. It is found in Africa, including South Africa and Ethiopia.

References

External links 
 

Heliothis
Moths of Africa
Moths described in 1907